Lucie Nesnídalová (born 31 July 2002) is a Czech slalom canoeist who has competed at the international level since 2017.

She won a silver medal in the K1 team event at the 2021 World Championships in Bratislava.

References

External links

Living people
Czech female canoeists
2002 births
Medalists at the ICF Canoe Slalom World Championships
People from Rokycany
Sportspeople from the Plzeň Region